Wáshington Ortuño (13 May 1928 – 15 September 1973) was a former Uruguayan footballer, who played for CA Peñarol.

For the Uruguay national football team, he was part of the 1950 FIFA World Cup winning team, but did not play in any matches in the tournament.

References

World Cup Champions Squads 1930 - 2002
A primeira grande zebra do Mundial 

1928 births
Uruguayan footballers
Uruguay international footballers
1950 FIFA World Cup players
FIFA World Cup-winning players
Uruguayan Primera División players
Peñarol players
1973 deaths

Association football midfielders